Nettie Grooss (2 August 1905 – 11 April 1977) was a Dutch sprinter. She competed in the women's 100 metres at the 1928 Summer Olympics.

References

External links
 

1905 births
1977 deaths
Athletes (track and field) at the 1928 Summer Olympics
Dutch female sprinters
Olympic athletes of the Netherlands
Sportspeople from The Hague
Olympic female sprinters
20th-century Dutch women